Antichloris clementi is a moth of the family Erebidae. It was described by Schaus in 1938. It is found in Cuba.

References

Moths described in 1938
Euchromiina
Moths of the Caribbean
Endemic fauna of Cuba